Irina Polyakova (born 9 March 1961) is a former Russian female Paralympic cross-country skier and biathlete. She has competed at the Winter Paralympics in 1998, 2002, 2006 and in 2010 representing Russia. She was named as one of the most popular women by the BBC in its special multi format series, the 100 Women in 2015.

Career 
Irina Polyakova took the sport of skiing and biathlon only at the age of 35 which is quite late in her career and got the opportunity to represent Russia at the 1998 Winter Paralympics at the age of 37. She wasn't successful in her maiden Paralympic event as she went medalless  before claiming her maiden Paralympic medal, a silver medal in the women's cross-country skiing relay team event at the 2002 Winter Paralympics. Irina also was part of the Russian relay team which claimed gold medal in the women's relay open event in the 2006 Winter Paralympics.

Coaching career 
After retiring from international skiing in 2011, she started her coaching career.

References 

1961 births
Living people
Russian female biathletes
Russian female cross-country skiers
Paralympic cross-country skiers of Russia
Paralympic biathletes of Russia
Biathletes at the 1998 Winter Paralympics
Biathletes at the 2002 Winter Paralympics
Biathletes at the 2006 Winter Paralympics
Biathletes at the 2010 Winter Paralympics
Cross-country skiers at the 1998 Winter Paralympics
Cross-country skiers at the 2002 Winter Paralympics
Cross-country skiers at the 2006 Winter Paralympics
Cross-country skiers at the 2010 Winter Paralympics
Medalists at the 2002 Winter Paralympics
Medalists at the 2006 Winter Paralympics
Paralympic gold medalists for Russia
Paralympic silver medalists for Russia
Sportspeople from Kazan
BBC 100 Women
Recipients of the Medal of the Order "For Merit to the Fatherland" I class
Paralympic medalists in cross-country skiing
21st-century Russian women